Easy Virtue is a 1928 British silent romance film directed by Alfred Hitchcock and starring Isabel Jeans, Franklin Dyall and Ian Hunter.

The movie is loosely based on the 1924 play Easy Virtue by Noël Coward. It was made at the Islington Studios in London. The film's art direction is by Clifford Pember.

Plot

In 1926, Larita Filton (Isabel Jeans) testifies at her divorce. In a flashback, her husband, a drunken brute named Aubrey Filton (Franklin Dyall), is getting drunk in an artist's studio, as Mrs. Filton's portrait is being painted. The painter, Claude Robson (Eric Bransby Williams), is smitten with Larita. He sends her a letter asking her to leave the physically abusive Mr. Filton, and marry him. She rejects Claude's advances and is pushing him away when Aubrey walks in on them. She appears to be embracing Claude. Aubrey confronts Claude. Claude fires a gun, but misses Aubrey. Aubrey begins to beat Claude severely with his walking cane. In the struggle, Claude shoots Aubrey. Two servants enter and, seeing Claude with the gun, run for the police. In the next frame, the police are kneeling over Claude's lifeless body. Larita is holding her wounded husband lovingly in her lap. He picks up the letter from Claude.

Aubrey files for divorce on the grounds of adultery. The jury rejects Larita's testimony and instead decides in Aubrey's favor, in large part because Larita is quite attractive, and Claude had written a will leaving her his entire fortune "to another man's wife!" As Larita leaves the courtroom, she hides her face from photographers trying to take her picture.

Larita leaves for the French Riviera to avoid continued unwanted attention. As she registers at the hotel, she remembers all the media frenzy around her, and at the last second, changes the name she registers under to Larita Grey.

She is happy there, living anonymously. One day, at a tennis match, she is struck in the eye by the tennis ball of a rich younger man, John Whittaker (Robin Irvine). He apologises profusely and takes her for medical treatment. He soon asks Larita to marry him. She protests that surely he must want to know more about her first. He responds that all he need know is that he loves her. They marry and return to England to meet his family. While John's father likes Larita very much, his mother strongly disapproves even before meeting her. John's mother believes she recognises Larita, but cannot place her. She questions John about Larita and chastises him for marrying someone about whom he knows nothing. John begs his mother to be kind to her for his sake. However, she is only kind to Larita in public. Privately, she tries to turn everyone against Larita.

As John's mother continues to make her life miserable, Larita begs John to return to the South of France where they were happy. He asks why she cannot be happy in England. She tells him his family hates her, and that they are teaching him to hate her too. Later that day, John admits to his old girlfriend that his mother has helped him see that he made a huge mistake marrying Larita. Unknown to him, Larita overhears him.

John's sister sees Larita's picture in the papers. In the caption, Larita is identified as the former Mrs. Filton. John's sister shows her mother. Mrs. Whittaker confronts Larita in front of the family, stating, "In our world, we do not understand this code of easy virtue", as she thrusts the magazine under Larita's nose. Larita responds that indeed they do not understand much of anything.
 
Mrs. Whittaker, fearing scandal and gossip about her family, tries to intimidate Larita into staying in her room during the party the family is hosting that same evening. Instead, Larita makes a grand entrance. However, Larita confides to a friend that she will leave John so he can obtain a divorce. Before leaving, she tells the old girlfriend, Sarah (Enid Stamp Taylor), whom his mother had thought a suitable match for John, and who has been quite kind to her, "Sarah - YOU ought to have married John."

Larita sits anonymously in the court gallery, weeping, as she watches John's uncontested divorce. A reporter recognises her. As she exits the court, photographers are waiting for her. This time, she does not flee. Instead, she exclaims to the throng of photographers, "Shoot! There's nothing left to kill."

Cast
 Isabel Jeans as Larita Filton
 Robin Irvine as John Whittaker
 Franklin Dyall as Aubrey Filton
 Eric Bransby Williams as Claude Robson
 Ian Hunter as The plaintiff's counsel Mr. Greene
 Violet Farebrother as Mrs. Whittaker
 Frank Elliott as Colonel Whittaker
 Dacia Deane as Marion Whittaker
 Dorothy Boyd as Hilda Whittaker
 Enid Stamp Taylor as Sarah
 Benita Hume as Telephone receptionist (uncredited)

Alfred Hitchcock's cameo is a signature occurrence in almost all of Hitchcock's films. About 21 minutes into the film he can be seen walking past a tennis court carrying a walking stick.

Preservation and home video status
A restoration of Easy Virtue was completed in 2012 as part of the BFI's £2 million "Save the Hitchcock 9" project to restore all of the director's surviving silent films.

Like Hitchcock's other British films, all of which are copyrighted worldwide, Easy Virtue has been heavily bootlegged on home video. As of October 2018, the restored version only has appeared on DVD and Blu-ray from Elephant Films in France.

At the end of 2023, Easy Virtue will enter the public domain in the United States but only in its non-restored, scoreless form. It will remain copyrighted in the rest of the world until the end of 2050.

See also
 Easy Virtue (2008) – remake of the same play

References

External links
 
 
 Easy Virtue at the British Film Institute's Screenonline
 Alfred Hitchcock Collectors’ Guide: Easy Virtue at Brenton Film

1928 films
British black-and-white films
British romantic drama films
British silent feature films
British films based on plays
Films directed by Alfred Hitchcock
Films set in 1926
Films set in England
Films set on the French Riviera
Islington Studios films
1928 romantic drama films
1920s British films
Silent romantic drama films